Fell in love with a Band by Chris Handyside is a comprehensive biography about Jack White and Meg White, otherwise known as The White Stripes. The biography delves into the childhoods of each member and talks about how the two met. It gives a full discography and provides more than 50 pictures.

References

American biographies